The Principality of Novgorod-Seversk or Novhorod-Siversk was a medieval Rus' principality centered on the town now called Novhorod-Siverskyi. The principality emerged after the central power of Kievan Rus' declined in the late 11th century, and Svyatoslav Olhovych managed to establish a local dynasty, the Olhovychi (Olgovichi), as a branch of the Rurikid house. Novgorod-Seversk was aligned to the Principality of Chernigov. In 1185, a large Rus' campaign against the Cumans (Polovtsy) ended in defeat for Prince Igor of Novhorod-Siverskyi, famously recorded in The Tale of Igor's Campaign. After the 1205 death of Roman the Great, the first prince of Galicia–Volhynia, the three sons of Igor seized power in Halych and reigned between 1206 and 1212. The principality was taken by the principality of Briansk after the Mongol invasions, and then by the Lithuanians when the power of the Golden Horde began to decline. In the fifteenth-century the principality was given to Prince Ivan of Mozhaisk when he fled from Grand Prince Vasily II.

See also
 Prince of Novgorod-Seversk
 Severia

Notes

References
 
 Martin, Janet, Medieval Russia, 980-1584, (Cambridge, 1995)

Subdivisions of Kievan Rus'
1139 establishments in Europe
Former principalities
12th-century establishments in Russia